The Best of The Doors is a compilation album by the Doors released in 2000, and is different from the albums of the same name released in 1973 and 1985. All three albums feature a slightly different track listing and a different photograph of the band's late singer Jim Morrison as cover art. Unlike its predecessors, the 2000 release includes both "Break On Through (To the Other Side)" and "The End" in their uncensored form.

Track listing
All songs are written by the Doors (John Densmore, Robby Krieger, Ray Manzarek, and Jim Morrison), except where noted.

Original single disc version

Bonus disc
The album was also released as a limited edition digipak, which included the following bonus disc:

Double disc version
The double disc version of the compilation is notable for a remastered track from one of the two post-Morrison albums. The track "No Me Moleste Mosquito" appeared as "The Mosquito" on the 1972 album Full Circle. This was the second acknowledgement of the band's last two (and only post-Morrison) studio albums, since the appearance of "Tightrope Ride", taken from the album Other Voices (1971), on 1997's The Doors: Box Set.

Disc one

Disc two

Charts and certifications

Charts

Certifications

References

External links 
 

2000 greatest hits albums
Albums produced by Paul A. Rothchild
Albums produced by Bruce Botnick
Elektra Records compilation albums
The Doors compilation albums